Mega Brands America, Inc., formerly known as Rose Art Industries, LLC, is an American arts and stationery company based in Irvine, California. It sells products primarily under the brands RoseArt, The Board Dudes, The Write Dudes, USA Gold, Moon Products, MEGA Puzzles and Fuzzy Poster. It is owned by parent company MEGA Brands Inc., a Montreal-based company. It has additional operations in Fife, Washington; Lafayette, Indiana; and Lewisburg, Tennessee.

History
The company was established when Isidor Rosen founded the Rosebud Art Company in New York City in 1923. During the 1970s, the company renamed itself RoseArt. RoseArt has been a subsidiary of Mega Brands since 2005.

On January 24, 2010, Mega Bloks Inc. agreed to acquire The Board Dudes, Inc., a privately held company based in Corona, California. The Board Dudes designs and distributes a range of products for the school, home and office supply markets. Primary product categories include dry erase boards, cork boards, school and locker products, writing instruments, novelty items and storage products sold under the Board Dudes, Locker Dudes, Write Dudes, and related brands. These goods are sold in mass and specialty channels throughout the U.S. and Canada. The Board Dudes founders and principals, Ben Hoch and Michael Cerillo, both maintain senior managerial roles within the arts and stationery division of MEGA Brands.

In September 2006, the former owners of Rose Art Industries filed suit against Mega Brands, alleging insider trading by company executives in 2005 and 2006. MEGA Brands counter sued and in November 2009 the parties settled. The Rosens agreed to pay back $17.2 million and forgo claims of an additional $54.8 million.

Early in 2021, LaRose Industries, LLC, the parent company of Cra-Z-Art, announced it purchased RoseArt back from the Mattel toy company.  RoseArt and associated items will be available at major retailers and specialty stores.  The purchase is an important and celebratory milestone for LaRose and Lawrence Rosen as it reunites the RoseArt brands with the Rosen family.

Products

RoseArt

Magic Fun Dough 

 Tubs of magic dough modeling compound. It is similar to silly putty in texture, and comes in Kits.

See also
 Crayola

References

External links
 MEGA Brands home page

Companies based in Essex County, New Jersey
Design companies established in 1923
Livingston, New Jersey
Toy companies of the United States
Manufacturing companies established in 1923
1923 establishments in New York City